Stigmella honshui is a moth of the family Nepticulidae. It is only known from Honshu in Japan.

The larvae feed on Malus pumila. They mine the leaves of their host plant.

External links
Japanese Species of the Genus Stigmella (Nepticulidae: Lepidoptera)

Nepticulidae
Moths of Japan
Moths described in 1985